Eko or EKO may refer to:

People 
 Ejembi Eko (born 1952), Nigerian jurist
 Eko Fresh (born 1983), German rapper
 Eko Purjianto (born 1976), Indonesian footballer
 Eko Yuli Irawan (born 1989), Indonesian weightlifter
 John O'Connor (musician) (born 1949; stagename: Eko), British musician

Fictional characters
 Mr. Eko, a character from the TV series Lost
 Eko, a character in the Arcana Heart video game series

Places
 Elko Regional Airport (IATA airport code EKO), in Nevada, USA
 Lagos (lit. Warcamp), Nigeria

Groups, organizations, companies, brands
 Eko (media production company), an interactive media production company
 Eko Guitars, an Italian guitar company
 Eko India Financial Services, an Indian financial services company
 EKO, an organic produce ecolabel used in the Netherlands
 EKO, a brand of petrol stations operated by Hellenic Petroleum
 EKOenergy, an ecolabel for energy
 Ekornes, a Norwegian furniture company
 Eko Software, a French video game company
 Ekō, a global non-profit advocacy organization and online community previously known as SumOfUs

Other uses 
 Edgeworth–Kuiper object
 "Èkó", a 2019 song by Coldplay
 Eko, a currency circulating in Findhorn Ecovillage, Scotland

See also

 Ekko (disambiguation)
 Eco (disambiguation)
 Echo (disambiguation)
 Ecco (disambiguation)
 
 Eckō Unltd., a clothing brand
 EKCO, a British electronics company